Podhu Nalan Karudhi is a 2019 Tamil action film written and directed by Zion and produced by AVE Anbuvelrajan. The film features Karunakaran, Santhosh Prathap and Adith Arun in the leading roles. The music was composed by A. Hariganesh with cinematography by Suwaminathan. The film released on 7 February 2019.

Cast

 Karunakaran as Poovarasan
 Santhosh as Napoleon
 Adith Arun as Kannan
 Yog Japee as Uthiram 
 Anu Sithara as Poovarasan's love interest
 Subiksha as Kannan's love interest
 Leesha Eclairs as Napoleon's love interest
 Imman Annachi as Vadivu
 Muthazhagan as Amber

Production
Zion initially approached Santhosh Prathap and Ashok Selvan to play the lead roles, but the latter was later replaced by Adith Arun. Actresses Anu Sithara and Leesha also joined the cast in July 2016. The film began production during July 2016 and was completed after being shot over fifty consecutive days.

Soundtrack 
Music composed by Hariganesh.
"Nee Ondrum Karpodu" - Hariganesh

Reception 
Thinkal Menon of The Times of India opined that "The raw portrayal of money lending in the city by Zion was a good attempt, but the execution, which involves some over-the-top sequences made the premise insipid. A few thrilling moments and more appealing characterisations would have made it a better watch". Avinash Ramichandran of The New Indian Express wrote that "The characters are interesting, no doubt, but the making is uninspiring".

References

External links
 

2019 films
2010s Tamil-language films